The Caribbean Broadcasting Network (formerly LKK Group) is a broadcasting company, headquartered in the Hollywood Center Studios (HCS) in Hollywood, California. The company owns and operates four television stations, two in Puerto Rico and two in the U.S. Virgin Islands. The stations are affiliates of Cozi TV, FOX, LATV, & NBC.

History
The company (as LKK Group) became involved in Caribbean broadcasting in 2003 when it learned that Puerto Rico lacked a National Public Radio (NPR) station, according to Keith Bass, the company’s President. It quickly established a radio station, WVGN, on the island, which was set up to receive NPR’s national feed; the company eventually sold WVGN to R.J. Watkins & his Virgin Islands Radio Entertainment Detroit, LLC on February 17, 2015, after which the station's call sign was changed to its current call sign.

Present
Today, the company takes network television feeds from New York and sends them via satellite to receiving sites on the two islands. Syndicated and local programming is also inserted in  Hollywood. On the islands themselves, the company maintains relatively small operations with sales and service staffs. Everything else is done from  Hollywood.

The company has ambitious plans for its continued growth. There are many other islands in the Caribbean that are under-served by broadcast television, Bass has observed.

It also plans to increase the amount of local programming that it produces. That “local” programming will likely be produced at HCS, explains Bass, where gear, crew and all the other production necessities are readily available.

Caribbean Broadcasting Network-owned TV stations

Puerto Rico
WSJP-LD 30 (Cozi TV/FOX/Comet/This TV) - Aguadilla, Puerto Rico

U.S. Virgin Islands
WVXF 17 (This TV/FOX) - Saint Thomas, U.S. Virgin Islands
WVGN-LD 19 (NBC) - Saint Thomas, U.S. Virgin Islands

Former stations
WPRU-LP 20 (ABC) - Aguadilla, Puerto Rico (silent/call sign deleted from Federal Communications Commission (FCC) website)
WEON-LP 60 (FOX) - Saint Croix, U.S. Virgin Islands (silent/license cancelled by FCC)

Caribbean Broadcasting Network-owned radio stations

Former stations
WVGN 107.3 (National Public Radio) - U.S. Virgin Islands (sold to R.J. Watkins in 2015; now WVIE)
WSJX-LP 24 (LATV) - Aguadilla, Puerto Rico (license surrendered January 14, 2021)

References

External links
Caribbean Broadcasting Network website
Archived version of LKK Group website

Companies based in Los Angeles
Broadcasting companies of the United States
Television broadcasting companies of the United States
Hollywood, Los Angeles